Moonshine Bandits is an American country rap group composed of Dusty "Tex" Dahlgren and Brett "Bird" Brooks. The duo formed in California in 2003 and has released a number of albums, the most recent being The Whiskey Never Dries released in August 2019.

Music career
The duo was formed in California in 2003 and released their debut album, Soggy Crackerz. They met up with Ty Weathers who is the founder of Burn County Music, which has continued to work closely in assisting majority of the Moonshine Bandits Blue Core/Dirt Rock sound. Soggy Crackerz was followed by Prohibition in 2006 and Divebars and Truckstops in 2010.

Moonshine Bandits signed with Suburban Noize Records for the release of their fourth album, Whiskey and Women, in 2011. The music video for "My Kind of Country" premiered on CMT Pure Country in February 2012 with a special appearance by Mike Allsup (The Beard Guy playing the guitar) from Modesto, California. 

In 2014, they partnered with Average Joes Entertainment for their fifth album Calicountry. Calicountry sold 3,000 copies in its first week of release, debuting at number 22 on the Billboard Top Country Albums chart and number 126 on the Billboard 200.  

Their sixth album, Blacked Out, was released in July 2015, and it debuted at No.158 on the Billboard 200 and No. 13 on the Top Country Albums chart, No. 10 on the Top Rap Albums chart, selling 4,000 copies in its debut week.

Discography

Albums

Extended plays

Singles

Music videos

References

External links

Country music groups from California
Average Joes Entertainment artists
Country music duos
Country rap musicians
Musical groups established in 2003
Suburban Noize Records artists
People from Los Banos, California